Mahadev Naik  is an Indian politician from the state of Goa. He was a MLA from the Shiroda, Goa, constituency.

He was Bharatiya Janata Party Minister in the Parsekar-led Government.

Ministry
He was a Minister in the Laxmikant Parsekar-led government in Goa. He lost the Siroda Assembly constituency in the 2017 Goa Legislative Assembly election. Naik joined Aam Aadmi Party in August 2021.

Portfolios
In the Parsekar-led cabinet, Naik held the charge of:
Industries
Textile & coir
Social welfare
Co-operation
Handicrafts

Controversy 
Opposition alleged that he was involved in a housing loan scam.

External links 
  Goa councle of ministers

References 

Members of the Goa Legislative Assembly
Living people
People from North Goa district
Bharatiya Janata Party politicians from Goa
Aam Aadmi Party politicians from Goa
Year of birth missing (living people)